Bijawar State was a princely state of colonial India, located in modern Chhatarpur district of Madhya Pradesh.

The native state of Bijawar covered an area of 2520 km2 (973 sq. m.) in the Bundelkhand Agency. Forests covered nearly half the total area of the state, which was believed to be rich in minerals, but lack of transport facilities had hindered the development of its resources.

History
The state takes its name from the chief town, Bijawar, which was founded by Bijai Singh, one of the Gond chiefs of Garha Mandla, in the 17th century. The first ruler of the state was Bir Singh Deo (1765–93). It was conquered in the 18th century by Chhatarsal, the founder of Panna, by whose descendants it is still held.

Bijawar became a British protectorate on 27 Mar 1811 and the rule of the territory was confirmed to Ratan Singh in 1811 by the British government for the usual deed of allegiance. In 1857 Bham Pratap Singh rendered signal services to the British during the Revolt of 1857, being rewarded with certain privileges and a hereditary salute of eleven guns. In 1866 he received the title of Maharaja, and the prefix Sawai in 1877. Bhan Pratap was succeeded on his death in 1899 by his adopted son, Sanwant Singh, a son of the Maharaja of Orchha.

The state acceded to India on 1 January 1950, and became part of the state of Vindhya Pradesh, which was merged into Madhya Pradesh on 1 November 1956.

Rulers
The rulers of the state belonged to the Bundela dynasty.

Rajas
 1765 – 1793  Bir Singh Deo                     
 1793 – 1802  Himmat Bahadur (usurper)
 1802 – 1810  Keshri Singh                      
 1811 – 1833  Ratan Singh
 1833 – 1847  Lakshman Singh
 1847 – 1877  Bham Pratap Singh

Sawai Maharajas
 1877 – 1899 Bham Pratap Singh
 1900 – 1940 Savant Singh
 1940 – 1947 Govind Singh

Titular Maharaja
 1947 – 1983 Govind Singh
 1983 – present Jai Singh

See also
Panna State
Political integration of India
Bijawar-Panna Plateau

References

Princely states of Bundelkhand
Chhindwara district
Rajputs
1765 establishments in India
1950 disestablishments in India